Japanese submarine I-24 may refer to one of the following submarines of the Imperial Japanese Navy:

 , a Kiraisen-type submarine launched in 1927 and known as I-24 until June 1938; sunk in January 1942
 , a Type C submarine launched in 1929 and sunk in June 1943

Japanese Navy ship names
Imperial Japanese Navy ship names